The Huangtai–Jinan East link line is a railway line in Jinan, Shandong, China. It is 10.5 km in length.

History 
Construction began in March 2020. The line opened on 16 November 2022.

Route 
The eastern terminus of the line is Jinan East railway station. It heads south and joins the Qingdao–Jinan railway east of Huangtai railway station. The line allows train services to call at both Jinan railway station and Jinan East.

References 

Railway lines in China
Railway lines opened in 2022